Joshua Powell Hofer, OAM  is an Australian swimmer with an intellectual disability. At the 1992 Paralympic Games for Persons with Mental Handicap, he won eleven medals - five gold, four silver and two bronze medals.

Personal

Hofer grew up in Perth, Western Australia and attended Christ Church Grammar School.  He was employed for many years by Royal Perth Hospital supply department.

Swimming career

In 1981, at the age of 17, he competed in swimming events at the 8th Special Olympics World Games in Minneapolis, Minnesota and won three gold medals in the Men's 4 x 50 m Freestyle Relay, Men's 200 m Freestyle Relay, Men's 100 m Backstroke and a bronze medal in the Men's 100 m Breaststroke.

At the 1992 Paralympic Games for Persons with Mental Handicap in Madrid, Spain, he won five gold medals in the Men's 100 m Backstroke, Men's 4 x 50 m Freestyle Relay, Men's 4 × 100 m Freestyle Relay, Men's 4 x 50 m Medley Relay and Men's 4 × 100 m Medley Relay, four silver medals in the Men's 50 m Butterfly, Men's 100 m Butterfly, Men's 50 m Backstroke, Men's 200 m Backstroke and two bronze medals in the Men's 200 m Freestyle and Men's 400 m Freestyle. In 1994, he competed at the first IPC Swimming World Championships in Malta and won a silver medal in the Men's 50 m Butterfly S14 and bronze medal in the Men's 100 m Freestyle S14.

In 2012, at the age of 38, he was training with the aim of competing at the 2012 London Paralympics. He is a member of the Beatty Park Masters Swimming Club.

Recognition
1993 - OAM for service to sport as a gold medallist at the Madrid 1992 Paralympic Games.
2000 - Australian Sports Medal

References

Australian male backstroke swimmers
Australian male butterfly swimmers
Australian male freestyle swimmers
Intellectual Disability category Paralympic competitors
Recipients of the Medal of the Order of Australia
Recipients of the Australian Sports Medal
Swimmers from Perth, Western Australia
Living people
Sportspeople with intellectual disability
20th-century Australian people
1973 births